NGC 3285 is a barred spiral galaxy located about 200 million light-years away in the constellation Hydra. The galaxy was discovered by astronomer John Herschel on March 24, 1835. NGC 3285 is a member of the Hydra Cluster.

See also 
 List of NGC objects (3001–4000)

References

External links

Hydra Cluster
Hydra (constellation)
Barred spiral galaxies
3285
31217
Astronomical objects discovered in 1835
Discoveries by John Herschel